Vets for Freedom is an American political advocacy organization founded in 2006 by veterans of the Iraq and Afghan wars, with connections to Republican Party leaders. The group was initially founded as a 527 group.

During the 2006 election, the group supported Senator Joseph Lieberman, who ran for reelection as an independent after losing the Democratic nomination. The group spent about $4.1 million on campaign ads in the 2008 election, mostly on ads promoting the "surge" of U.S. troops in the Iraq War in 2007.

Activities

2006 campaign
Vets for Freedom sponsored a full-page political ad in the Hartford Courant on August 14, 2006 endorsing Democratic US Senator Joe Lieberman and embarked on a television advertising campaign in Connecticut supportive of his reelection. Additionally, they financed an ad campaign in Georgia to support embattled Democratic Congressman Jim Marshall in 2006. He won by the smallest margin of any Democratic congressman that year.

2008 campaign
In October 2008, Vets for Freedom paid for a multimillion-dollar ad campaign criticizing the presidential candidacy of Senator Barack Obama. The group accuses the Democratic presidential nominee of caring more about his campaign than about troops in Iraq and Afghanistan. Previously, Vets for Freedom aired other advertisements criticizing Senator Obama's position on the Iraq War.

On October 10, 2008, Vets for Freedom released a Senate Analysis scorecard. In the VFF scorecard, every single Democratic senator was given the lowest possible grade of F. Three Republican senators were graded F, and 38 Republican senators received the grade of A+. VFF gave Sen Obama the score of 0.5%, or second lowest, and gave his running mate Sen Joe Biden the score of 0.0%, tying him for last place with Senator Ted Kennedy of Massachusetts. John McCain received a score of 93.5% and the grade of A−.

2010 campaign
In a campaign called "Operation 10-in-10," Vets for Freedom backed 10 Republican congressional candidates in the 2010 congressional elections. (Italicized denotes successful run.) The Iraq and Afghanistan veterans running for office included Allen West (FL-22), Steve Stivers (OH-15), Jonathan Paton (AZ-8), Ilario Pantano (NC-7), Adam Kinzinger (IL-11), Joe Heck (NV-3), Chris Gibson (NY-20), Brian Rooney (MI-7), Kevin Calvey (OK-5), and Tim Griffin (AR-2).

Founders
The group was founded by, among others, Wade Zirkle, David Bellavia, and Owen West.

Political connections
 In 2006 Vets for Freedom supported three candidates for office; Sen. Joe Lieberman (I-CT), Rep. Jim Marshall (D-GA), and Sen. Jim Talent (R-MO.)
As of May 2008, Vets for Freedom was supporting five candidates for the House of Representatives, all of them Republicans who have served in the armed forces.
 Zirkle was a regional field director for Republican Jerry Kilgore's unsuccessful 2005 campaign for governor of Virginia.
 A "key Vets for Freedom adviser is Bill Andresen, a Democrat and former chief of staff to embattled Sen. Joseph I. Lieberman of Connecticut."
Among the Vets for Freedom advisors are Weekly Standard Editor Bill Kristol and former Iraqi Coalition Provisional Spokesman Dan Senor.

Funding
VFF applied for status as a tax-exempt Nonprofit organization, but as of June 2006 the application was not approved. Zirkle said that "Initial funding came from family members and friends." It is now a 501(c)4 nonprofit organization.

The National Journal has reported that casino magnate Sheldon Adelson, the third richest man in America, has made a significant donation to Vets For Freedom.

See also
VoteVets.org

Notes

External links
 Overview and spending at OpenSecrets

Veterans' organizations in favor of the Iraq War
Organizations established in 2006
Iraq–United States relations
American military personnel
United States political action committees
American veterans' organizations
501(c)(4) nonprofit organizations